VDNKh may refer to:

 The name of the exhibition centers in former Soviet Republics 
 VDNKh (Russia), known as All-Russia Exhibition Center in 1992–2014
 National Complex Expocenter of Ukraine (formerly "VDNH of the Ukrainian SSR")
 Exhibition Pavilion, Minsk (formerly "VDNKh of the Byelorussian SSR")
 VDNKh (Moscow Metro), a Moscow Metro station